Anatoly Anatolevich Emelin; (born October 3, 1964) is a former Russian ice hockey player. He played right winger and scored 229 goals in 596 official games. After 1997-98 season, Emelin finished his player career and became a coach in HC Lada Togliatti. In 2006, he was promoted to head coach of the team.

Playing career 
Emelin's player career started in 1982 in the team of his home region capital, Salavat Yulaev Ufa, where he was playing until 1990 (with a two-season break in SKA Sverdlovsk). After that, Anatoly accepted the invitation of newly hired Lada coach Gennadiy Tsigurov, and helped to lead his new team to the highest division of Soviet hockey. During the 1992–93 season, Emelin tried himself in Sweden, but decided to return to Lada. Emelin retired in 1998.

Despite the fact that Anatoly's team became Russian Champions twice and won European Cup during his career, he was invited to the national team only once. In 1994, he participated in World Championship, where he scored 2 goals in six games.

Trivia 
As for now (2006), Anatoly Emelin is the youngest head coach of Russian Hockey Super League. Despite of that, he won his first games against former Lada coaches, Gennadiy Tsigurov and Petr Vorobiev, with the same score - 3:1.

Career statistics

International statistics

External links 

1964 births
HC Lada Togliatti players
Living people
Sportspeople from Ufa
Russian ice hockey coaches
Russian ice hockey right wingers
Salavat Yulaev Ufa players
Soviet ice hockey right wingers